Mikhail Mikhailovich Yanshin (20 October 1902 –  17 July 1976) was a Soviet stage and film actor.

Biography 
Yanshin was born in the city of Yukhnov, located in the present-day Kaluga Oblast. As a young man he worked as a carpenter. In 1919 he volunteered for the Red Army. Following the Russian Civil War, he enrolled at the school of the Moscow Art Theatre, where his classmates included Mikhail Kedrov and Boris Livanov. He joined the theatre's company in 1924 and remained a member of the institution until his death.

Yanshin's first notable roles at the Art Theatre were as Dobchinsky in Gogol's The Government Inspector and as the footman Petrushka in Griboyedov's Woe from Wit. He came to greater attention in the role of Lariosik in Bulgakov's Days of the Turbins, and thereafter began to receive work in other theaters. From 1934 to 1939 he was artistic director of the Moscow Theatre of the Forest Industry; from 1937 to 1941 he directed the Romen Theatre; and from 1950 to 1963 he was chief director of the Stanislavski and Nemirovich-Danchenko Moscow Academic Music Theatre. In 1963 Yanshin was criticized by the Soviet ministry of culture, which disapproved of his staging contemporary, non-traditional plays; he resigned and returned to the Moscow Art Theatre, where he was instrumental in the hiring of the director Oleg Yefremov.

In addition to his theatrical work, Yanshin appeared in many films. He was a frequent voice actor for Soyuzmultfilm cartoons, and often collaborated with the animators Zinaida and Valentina Brumberg. In addition to working as a voice actor, he also wrote the script of the Brumbergs' 1951 film The Night Before Christmas.

Yanshin was married three times. His first wife was Veronika Polonskaya, a fellow artist at the Moscow Art Theatre, whom he married in 1926. She is notable for having pursued an extra-marital affair with the poet Vladimir Mayakovsky, and both she and Yanshin were present when Mayakovsky committed suicide in 1930. They divorced in 1934, and that same year Yanshin married Nadezhda Kiselyova (stage name Lyalya Chyornaya), a dancer at the Rumen Theatre. They divorced in 1942, and Kiselyova later married Yanshin's old classmate Nikolai Khmelyov. From 1955 until his death Yanshin was married to Nonna Meyer, a performer at the Stanislavski Theatre.

He died in 1976 in Moscow and was buried at Novodevichy Cemetery.

Theatrical roles

 Three Sisters by Anton Chekhov  –  Ivan Chebutykin
 Uncle Vanya by Anton Chekhov – Ilya Ilyich Telegin
 The Seagull by Anton Chekhov – Pyotr Sorin
 The School for Scandal by Richard Brinsley Sheridan – Sir Peter
 Late Love by Alexander Ostrovsky –  Margaritov
 Fortune's Fool by Ivan Turgenev  –  Vasily Kouzovkin
 Solo for Hours of Battle by Osvald Zahradník –  Abel
 Even a Wise Man Stumbles by Alexander Ostrovsky – Nil Fedoseevich Mamaev
 Days of the Turbins by Mikhail Bulgakov – Lariosik

Selected filmography

Awards and honors
 Meritorious Artist of the RFSFR (1933)
 Order of the Badge of Honour (1937)
 People's Artist of the RFSFR (1947)
 People's Artist of the USSR (1955)
 Order of Lenin (1948 and 1972)
 Order of the Red Banner of Labour (1971)
 USSR State Prize (1975)
 State Prize of the RFSFR named for Konstantin Stanislavski (1970)

References

External links
 
 

1902 births
1976 deaths
People from Yukhnovsky District
People from Smolensk Governorate
Soviet male film actors
Soviet male stage actors
Soviet male voice actors
People of the Russian Civil War
Recipients of the Order of Lenin
Recipients of the USSR State Prize
Burials at Novodevichy Cemetery
People's Artists of the USSR
People's Artists of the RSFSR
Honored Artists of the RSFSR